Dara Seamus McAnulty  (born 2004) is a Northern Irish naturalist,  writer and  environmental campaigner. He is the youngest ever winner of the RSPB Medal and received the Wainwright Prize for UK nature writing in 2020 after being the youngest author to be shortlisted for the award. He is also the youngest author to be long-listed for the 2020 Baillie Gifford Prize for non-fiction and for the shortlist for the 2020 Books Are My Bag Readers' Awards, which he won in the non-fiction category

He was celebrated in "Points of Light" in 2018 by the prime minister for his work in connecting young people to nature. His campaigning work against raptor persecution and biodiversity loss earned him the RSPB Medal for Conservation in 2019, the award has been previously won by naturalists such as Sir David Attenborough.

His debut book Diary of a Young Naturalist which chronicles the turning of his fourteenth year, was released in May 2020. It details his intense connection to the natural world as an autistic teenager. He is the youngest ever author shortlisted for the Wainwright Prize for UK Nature Writing, and he won the 2020 prize. He was also awarded the An Post Irish Book Award for Newcomer of the Year. In 2021, he was shortlisted for the Dalkey Literary Award (Emerging Writer). and won the British Book Award for narrative non-fiction.

He has written for The Big Issue, The Guardian, has presented radio for BBC Radio Ulster and has appeared on BBC Springwatch and BBC Countryfile. He has also written and presented for BBC Radio Four Tweet of the Day He was a part of "The people's Walk For Wildlife" organised by television naturalist Chris Packham. He is a vocal campaigner on environmental issues.

In June 2021 McAnulty began writing a monthly nature column for The Irish Times.

He is an ambassador for the RSPCA and the Jane Goodall Institute.

He lives with his family near the  Mourne Mountains, Northern Ireland.

In mid-2021, McAnulty left Twitter after receiving abuse as a result of having raised concerns about Kate Clanchy's descriptions of autistic students and students of colour in her book Some Kids I Taught and What They Taught Me.

His second book, Wild Child, was shortlisted for the 2022 Wainwright Prize for Children's Writing on Nature and Conservation.

McAnulty was awarded the British Empire Medal (BEM) in the 2023 New Year Honours for services to the environment and people with autism spectrum disorder.

Selected publications

References 

2004 births
Living people
21st-century male writers
21st-century non-fiction writers from Northern Ireland
21st-century writers from Northern Ireland
British nature writers
Environmentalists from Northern Ireland
Male writers from Northern Ireland
Non-fiction environmental writers
People on the autism spectrum
Writers from Northern Ireland
Recipients of the British Empire Medal